Mount Douglas, (SENĆOŦEN: pq̕áls or PKOLS) usually referred to as Mount Doug by locals, is a prominent,  hill in Saanich, Greater Victoria, British Columbia. It is located in Mount Douglas Park in the municipality of Saanich on the ancestral lands of the Saanich and Songhees people.

Name 
The aboriginal Saanich and Songhees people called the hill PKOLS [pq̕áls], meaning "White Head" in SENĆOŦEN dialect. This hill was a culturally significant gathering and meeting place of the SENĆOŦEN and Lekwungen peoples, a site for ceremonies and sharing important news.

In the mid-nineteenth century, it was called Cedar Hill, and was home to logging operations.  Local mills supplied the growing city of Victoria, including the original Hudson's Bay Company fort, transporting lumber south along present day Cedar Hill Road.  It was brought under protected status in 1889.  Finding no cedars on the hill called "Cedar Hill," Captain Henry Kellett renamed it "Mount Douglas," as recorded in the Fort Victoria Journal by Roderick Finlayson. Although this informal renaming occurred in Douglas' lifetime (it was given the appellation "Mount" in order to honour the governor's status), the name "Mt. Douglas" was not officially adopted until 1910.

In 2013, an effort was started to reestablish its aboriginal name.
The Reclaim PKOLS movement has appealed to the BC Geographical Names Office for a formal name change. There has yet to be an approval of this petition.

The Neighbourhood
The namesake neighbourhood around the base of Mt. Douglas is a mix of residential neighbourhoods, hobby farms and working farms, roughly bounded by Cedar Hill Road, Cordova Bay Road, the Blenkinsop Valley and Parkside Crescent.  The farms of the Blenkinsop Valley (such as Madrona Farm) are protected by the provincial Agricultural Land Reserve.

Mount Douglas Mine

Mount Douglas has many trails. One trail in particular, on its south side (near the north-most point of Glendenning Trail), has an old abandoned mine. The mine has a small entrance, but it opens up inside.

PKOLS (Mount Douglas Park)
Mount Douglas is located in PKOLS (Mount Douglas Park) in Saanich, BC. The park covers 188 ha. It was established as a government reserve in 1858 by Governor James Douglas, and it became Mount Douglas Park in 1889 when the land was transferred to the city of Victoria.  Victoria managed the park until 1990 when it was transferred to the District of Saanich.

On August 15, 2022, Saanich Council approved a request from the W̱SÁNEĆ Leadership Council to move forward with a municipal park name restoration for PKOLS (Mount Douglas Park).

More images

References

External links
Article about Blenkinsop valley plane crash.
Description of the location and nomenclature from the BC Ministry of Sustainable Resource Management.
Description of the park from the Saanich municipal website.
A description of the area, including some historical information.
Website for Mount Douglas High School

Douglas
Neighbourhoods in Saanich, British Columbia